Georges Briard (May 17, 1917 – July 30, 2005 New York) was an American designer in the 1950s, 1960s, and 1970s. He is most well known for his signature dishware and glassware - everything from cups and plates to gold plated serving dishes.  His signature collection was stocked at noted department stores, such as Neiman Marcus and Bonwit Teller.

Born Jakub Brojdo in Ekaterinoslav, he moved to Chicago from Poland in 1937 and adopted the name Jascha Brojdo. He studied at the Art Institute of Chicago where he earned his MFA, while living in Oak Park with his physician uncle Aaron Broyde. He served in the U.S. Army throughout World War II as a Russian interpreter. As an Army interpreter fluent in several languages, he served on Gen. George S. Patton's staff. In 1947, he was discharged from the Army and started working in New York with Max Wille, whom he had met in art school. Brojdo began painting metal serving trays for sale, and evidently Wille came up with the name Georges Briard to mark commercial pieces – Brodjo was also a painter and would use his real name on his art pieces, but Georges Briard became his signature as a designer of these commercial articles, which were wildly popular and numerous. His notable designs were produced first by M. Wille Company, and later in a partnership with Philip Stetson.

In 2004, he was awarded the Frank S. Child Lifetime Achievement Award by The Society of Glass and Ceramic Decorators, in honor of his extraordinary contributions to the glass and ceramic decorating industry. He was preceded in death by his wife, Bronya (née Marks). He died in New York City at the age of 88.

References 
 New York Times death notice
 Auction lot from his estate

Polish emigrants to the United States
School of the Art Institute of Chicago alumni
American designers
2005 deaths
1917 births